Best in the World 2014 was the fifth Best in the World professional wrestling pay-per-view event produced by Ring of Honor (ROH). It took place on June 22, 2014 at the Tennessee State Fairground Sports Arena in Nashville, Tennessee. This show marked the company's debut on live pay-per-view across all major cable and satellite providers. The show was also available on the internet where it was streamed live on ROH's official Ustream page for $24.95.

Storylines
Seven professional wrestling matches were featured on the show that involved wrestlers from pre-existing scripted feuds, plots, and storylines played out on ROH TV. Wrestlers portrayed faces (heroes) or heels (villains) as they followed a series of events that built tension and culminated in a wrestling match or series of matches.

Reception
Larry Csonka, from 411mania.com said ROH held a good show, remarking that "There was a lot of good wrestling, with nothing bad, but at the same time there was nothing to really set ROH apart from the other products out there", calling it "not the homerun that ROH needed."

Dave Meltzer rated the Elgin-Cole with 4 stars as the best match of the event.

Results

References

Ring of Honor pay-per-view events
2014 in Tennessee
2014
Events in Nashville, Tennessee
Professional wrestling in Nashville, Tennessee
June 2014 events in the United States
2014 Ring of Honor pay-per-view events